Juliette Morillot (born 1959) is a French journalist. She is the author of several books about North Korea.

Early life
Morillot was born in 1959 in Bar-le-Duc, France. Her parents were English teachers.

Morillot graduated from the École du Louvre, where she earned a master's degree in museology. She learned Czech, Korean, Japanese and Russian at the Institut national des langues et civilisations orientales.

Career
Morillot taught at the University of Seoul in 1988. She has taught at the École de guerre.

Morillot was a contributing writer to Jeune Afrique from 2005 to 2015. She became the editor of La Revue in 2012, followed by Asialyst.

Morillot is the author of several books. She was awarded the Prix du meilleur livre de géopolitique 2018 from the Grenoble Geopolitics Festival for La Corée du Nord en 100 questions in 2018.

Selected works

References

1959 births
Living people
People from Bar-le-Duc
French women journalists
20th-century French journalists
21st-century French journalists
20th-century French women
21st-century French women